

40001–40100 

|-id=007
| 40007 Vieuxtemps ||  || Henri Vieuxtemps (1820–1881), a Belgian composer and violist || 
|-id=023
| 40023 ANPCEN ||  || The National Association for the Protection of the Sky and Nightly Environments in France (ANPCEN) was established in March 1999. Presently 581 communities have joined the association. Recently Strasbourg, a city of 300,000 inhabitants, has signed the association's charter. || 
|-id=092
| 40092 Memel ||  || Neman or Memel River, whose Couronian-Latvian name means silent || 
|}

40101–40200 

|-id=106
| 40106 Erben ||  || Karel Jaromír Erben (1811–1870), Czech author, poet, and collector of folk songs, rhymes and fairy tales || 
|-id=134
| 40134 Marsili ||  || The Marsili undersea volcano located in the Tyrrhenian Sea, south of Naples, Italy. It is Europe's highest and largest submarine volcano. || 
|}

40201–40300 

|-id=206
| 40206 Lhenice ||  || Lhenice, South Bohemia, Czech market town † || 
|-id=209
| 40209 Morrispodolak ||  || Morris Podolak (born 1947) is a Professor of planetary sciences at Tel-Aviv University whose long career includes studying giant planet formation, protostellar discs, and the structure and evolution of comets. || 
|-id=210
| 40210 Peixinho ||  || Nuno Peixinho (born 1971) from the University of Coimbra (Portugal) is a planetary scientist who studies the chemical composition of small bodies across the solar system. || 
|-id=227
| 40227 Tahiti ||  || Tahiti, the largest island in French Polynesia, where the British astronomer Charles Green observed the 1769 transit of Venus || 
|-id=230
| 40230 Rožmberk ||  || Rožmberkové (The Rosenbergs), one of the most significant Bohemian noble families || 
|-id=248
| 40248 Yukikajiura ||  || Yuki Kajiura (born 1965) is a Japanese composer and musical producer. She has composed the soundtrack music for many anime films and has formed the musical groups FictionJunction and Kalafina. || 
|}

40301–40400 

|-id=328
| 40328 Dow || 1999 MK || Marjorie Dow Healy (1906–2000), mother of David Healy who discovered this minor planet || 
|}

40401–40500 

|-id=409
| 40409 Taichikato ||  || Taichi Kato (born 1961), Japanese astronomer || 
|-id=410
| 40410 Příhoda ||  || Pavel Příhoda (born 1934), Czech author and astronomy popularizer, editor-in-chief of The Czech Astronomical Yearbook || 
|-id=436
| 40436 Sylviecoyaud ||  || Sylvie Coyaud, a French-Italian scientific reporter and amateur astronomer || 
|-id=440
| 40440 Dobrovský ||  || Josef Dobrovský (1753–1829), a Czech linguist, who codified the rules of the written Czech language || 
|-id=441
| 40441 Jungmann ||  || Josef Jungmann (1773–1847), Czech poet, publicist and literary historian, author of the Czech-German Dictionary || 
|-id=444
| 40444 Palacký ||  || František Palacký (1798–1876), Czech historian and politician || 
|-id=447
| 40447 Lorenzoni ||  || Giuseppe Lorenzoni (1843–1914), an Italian astronomer and scientist || 
|-id=457
| 40457 Williamkuhn ||  || William Kuhn (1918–2003), American amateur astronomer, designer of the Orange County Astronomers 57 cm Kuhn telescope at Anza, California Src || 
|-id=459
| 40459 Rektorys ||  || Karel Rektorys (born 1923), Czech mathematician and professor at the Czech Technical University in Prague || 
|-id=463
| 40463 Frankkameny ||  || Frank Kameny (1925–2011), American astronomer in the 1950s || 
|}

40501–40600 

|-bgcolor=#f2f2f2
| colspan=4 align=center | 
|}

40601–40700 

|-id=684
| 40684 Vanhoeck ||  || Luc Vanhoeck (1959–2005), Belgian amateur astronomer and pioneer of digital astrophotography || 
|}

40701–40800 

|-id=706
| 40706 Milam ||  || Stefanie N. Milam (born 1980) is an astrochemist at NASA Goddard Space Flight Center. Her expertise ranges across the electromagnetic spectrum and from interstellar ices to evolved stars to solar system objects. She is Deputy Project Scientist for Planetary Science for the James Webb Space Telescope. || 
|-id=763
| 40763 Zloch ||  || František Zloch (born 1949) is a retired solar observer of the Czech Academy of Sciences in Ondřejov. He conducted systematic observations of solar activity from 1981 to 2011, which were used by the International Patrol Service. He was also the founder and first director of the Rimavská Sobota Observatory (1975–1981). || 
|-id=764
| 40764 Gerhardiser ||  || Gerhard Iser (born 1962), German amateur astronomer and mentor of one of the discoverers || 
|-id=774
| 40774 Iwaigame ||  || Iwaigame Mountain, located in the southern part of the Asahi mountain range. || 
|-id=775
| 40775 Kalafina ||  || Kalafina, a Japanese vocal group formed in 2007 by composer Yuki Kajiura to produce the soundtrack music for the anime "Kara no Kyoukai", also known in English as "The Garden of Sinners". Their popularity has grown and they are now a neoclassical pop group presenting frequent concerts in Japan and internationally. || 
|-id=776
| 40776 Yeungkwongyu ||  || William Kwong Yu Yeung (born 1960), a Canadian amateur astronomer and one of the world's most prolific amateur discoverers of minor planets and comets. He has also found J002E3, believed to be the Apollo 12 S-IVB stage. || 
|-id=795
| 40795 Akiratsuchiyama ||  || Akira Tsuchiyama (born 1954) is a professor at Ritsumeikan University (Japan) and leader of the Itokawa sample analysis for the Hayabusa spacecraft mission. He specializes in studying primitive solar-system materials and is a pioneer for the three-dimensional study of materials using X-ray microtomography. || 
|}

40801–40900 

|-bgcolor=#f2f2f2
| colspan=4 align=center | 
|}

40901–41000 

|-id=917
| 40917 Pauljorden ||  || Paul Jorden (born 1951) has a unique career that has included leadership positions in the scientific community (Royal Greenwich Observatory) and industry (e2v technologies). His teams have developed state-of-the-art imaging sensors and applied them to ground-based and space astronomy over a period of more than three decades. || 
|-id=919
| 40919 Johntonry ||  || John Tonry (born 1953), of the University of Hawaii, has worked at the cutting edge of science and technology in astronomy. He developed the orthogonal transfer CCD concept, and a new method for extragalactic distance determinations, and was on the team that made the Nobel Prize winning discovery of dark energy. || 
|-id=981
| 40981 Stephenholland ||  || Stephen Holland (born 1956), of Lawrence Berkeley National Laboratory, is a pioneer in the development of silicon detectors for medical imaging, x-ray photon sciences, astronomy, and high-energy physics. || 
|-id=994
| 40994 Tekaridake ||  || Tekaridake, a mountain in the northern part of Shizuoka Prefecture, Japan || 
|}

References 

040001-041000